Kaztal (Kaztal; Russian: Казталовка) is a village in north-western Kazakhstan. It is the administrative center of Kaztal District in West Kazakhstan Region. Population:

References

Populated places in West Kazakhstan Region